Tenerife Province was one of the provinces of the Sovereign State of Magdalena.

Provinces of the Republic of New Granada
History of Magdalena Department